Veerapandiya Kattabomman is a book written on the biography of Veerapandiya Kattabomman by M. P. Sivagnanam (Ma. Po. Si.). The first edition of the book was published in the 1940s.

Later the book took many publications. This was one of Ma.Po.Si's 100 books that were taken over by the Government.

Ma. Po. Si. brings out the inevitable role that Kattabomman played in pioneering the freedom movement in India.Ma.Po. Si illustrates how Veerapandiya Kattabomman expressed the first agitation against the British colonisation. His agitation paved way to the Vellore Mutiny in 1806. It was only after 50 years of these two rebellions down the South,Seppoy Mutiny\Indian Rebellion of 1857 started in North.

References
http://www.silambuselvar.com/english/works.php
http://kavvinmedia.com/BlogDetails.aspx?PostID=294
http://www.keetru.com/index.php?option=com_content&view=article&id=10004:2010-07-16-10-34-42&catid=1149:10&Itemid=417
sify.com

Indian biographies